Thomas James Pickard (4 June 1911 – 1967) was an English professional footballer who played as a goalkeeper.

Career
Born in Amble, Pickard played for his home-town club before joining Sunderland and then Gateshead, where he made 17 appearances in the 1930–31 Football League season. He joined Bradford City in September 1931, making 6 league appearances for the club, before moving to Barrow in August 1932. He made 174 league appearances for Barrow over five seasons.

He was capped for England schoolboys in 1925.

Sources

References

1911 births
1967 deaths
People from Amble
Footballers from Northumberland
English footballers
England schools international footballers
Association football goalkeepers
Sunderland A.F.C. players
Gateshead A.F.C. players
Bradford City A.F.C. players
Barrow A.F.C. players
English Football League players